Surendra Verma (born 1942) is an Indian-Australian journalist and writer of science books for a popular audience.

Early life and education
Verma was born in India in 1942. He has been working in Melbourne, Australia since 1970.

Career
Verma has written a number of book which explain scientific topics to a general audience. Verma's books have received positive reviews, and have been published in Australia, UK, US and India and have been translated into 14 languages.

Books
The Tunguska Fireball: Solving One of the Greatest Mysteries of the 20th Century (Icon Books, UK; 2005) 
Why Aren't They Here?: The Questions of Life on Other Worlds (Icon Books, UK; 2007)
The Cause of Mosquitoes' Sorrow: Beginnings, Blunders and Breakthroughs in Science (Icon Books, UK, 2007)
The Little Book of Scientific Principles, Theories & Things (New Holland Publishers, Australia; 2005) 
The Little Book of Maths Theorems, Theories & Things (New Holland Publishers, Australia; 2008)
The Little Book of Unscientific Proportions, Theories & Things (New Holland Publishers, Australia; 2011)
The Little Book of the Mind: How We Think and Why We Think (New Holland Publishers, Australia; 2012) + a children's book
Who Killed T. Rex: Uncover the mystery of the vanished dinosaurs (New Holland Publishers, Australia; 2010) 
 Learn & Unlearn: The novel way to rethink the things that matter in life (New Holland Publishers, Australia; 2015).
 Little-Big Book of Science in 100 Words (Orient Publishing, India; 2015)

References 

1942 births
Living people
Australian science writers